Benjamin Parth (born 27 July 1988 in Zams) is an Austrian chef.

Life 
Benjamin Parth was born to Alfons and Maria Odile Parth. Parth attended kindergarten and primary school in Ischgl, Paznaun. Parth successfully completed his studies at the secondary school in Landeck in 2004.

Parth then completed an apprenticeship from 2004 to 2007 at the Hotel YSCLA under the residence of Heinz Winkler. He then visited Annecy, France and Nice in order to improve his language ability. In November 2007, he went to Nice to be a Stagiaire Cuisiner at the Restaurant l’Univers under Christian Plumail (1* Michelin). From December 2007 to May 2008, he led the Stüva restaurant in Hotel Yscla in Ischgl. In summer 2008 he cooked at the Can Fabes, among others, under Santi Santamaria in Sant Celoni (3* Michelin), in the Bind restaurant under Christian Bind in Krusa and the Illhaeusern restaurant under Marc Haeberlin, before he returned to the Hotel YSCLA for the 2008/2009 winter season. After a spell in Wolfsburg, in the summer of 2009, at the Aqua restaurant under Sven Elverfeld, he has been head chef of the Stüva restaurant in Ischgl continuously since 2009.

Awards 
2009: First award from Gault-Millau with one toque (with 14 points)
2009: Award for Austria's youngest award-winning chef
2009: Two spoons award from Schlemmer Atlas
2009: Three stars from A la Carte
2010: One toque from Gault-Millau
2011: 18 out of 20 points from La Vanguardia
2011: One toque from Gault-Millau
2012: Two toques from Gault-Millau
2012: Upgrading to four stars from A la Carte
2012: Upgrading to three spoons from Schlemmer Atlas
2013: CHEFS NextGeneration – 2013 participant
2013: Falstaff – two forks
2013: Schlemmer Atlas – three cutlery sets
2013: Schlemmer Atlas — Top 20 Chefs in Austria
2013: Meyer's Guide — two cocks
2013: Gault Millau – two toques
2013: Guide A la Carte – four stars
2014: Gault Millau – two toques
2014: Guide A la Carte – four stars
2014: Bertelsmann-Guide – rising star of the year 2014
2014: Falstaff – three forks
2014: Schlemmer Atlas – three spoons
2014: Schlemmer Atlas — Top 20 Chefs in Austria
2014: CHEFS NextGeneration – 2014 participant
2015: Gault Millau – three toques
2015: Guide A la Carte – five stars
2015: Schlemmer Atlas — Top 20 Chefs in Austria
2015: Falstaff – four forks
2016: Gault Millau – three toques
2016: Guide A la Carte – five stars
2016: Falstaff – four forks
2017: Gault Millau – three toques
2017: Guide A la Carte – five stars
2017: Falstaff – three forks
2018: Gault Millau – three toques
2018: Guide A la Carte – five stars
2018: Falstaff – four forks (96 points)
2018: Gault&Millau chef of the year 2019
2019: Gault Millau – three toques
2019: Guide A la Carte – five stars
2019: Falstaff – four forks
2020: Gault Millau – four toques (18.5 points)
2020: Guide A la Carte – five stars (97 points)
2023: Gault Millau – five toques (19 points)

External links 
 Website of Benjamin Parth

References 

Austrian chefs
1988 births
Living people
People from Zams